is a railway station on the Minamiaso Railway Takamori Line in Minamiaso Village, Aso District, Kumamoto Prefecture.

Since the 2016 Kumamoto earthquakes, the station has suspended operations due to severe damage on the line.

Station layout 
The station has a single platform with one track. The station is unmanned, but has a wooden station building. Currently, the former station office has been renovated into the station café Hisaneya, which is open only on weekends.

Usage

History 

 February 12, 1928 - opened for business.
 February 20, 1971 - the station became unmanned.
 On April 1, 1986 - the station was converted from the Takamori Line of the Japanese National Railways to Minamiaso Railway.
 April 14–16, 2016 - the Kumamoto Earthquake damaged the line's bridges and tunnel structures, and operations were suspended.

References

External links 

 Official website (in Japanese)

Railway stations in Kumamoto Prefecture
Railway stations closed in 2015
Railway stations opened in 1928